The surface of the Moon has many features, including mountains and valleys, craters, and maria—wide flat areas that look like seas from a distance but are probably solidified molten rock. Some of these features are listed.

Maria features

Lunar maria (singular mare) are large, dark, regions of the Moon. They do not contain any water, but are believed to have been formed from molten rock from the Moon's mantle coming out onto the surface of the Moon. This list also includes the one oceanus and the features known by the names lacus, palus and sinus. The modern system of lunar nomenclature was introduced in 1651 by Riccioli. Riccioli's map of the Moon was drawn by Francesco Maria Grimaldi, who has a crater named after him.

Maria and Oceanus

There is also a region on the Lunar farside that was briefly misidentified as a mare and named Mare Desiderii (Sea of Dreams). It is no longer recognized. Other former maria include:

Mare Parvum ("Small Sea"), immediately to the east of Inghirami
Mare Incognitum ("Unknown Sea")
Mare Novum ("New Sea"), northeast of Plutarch
Mare Struve ("Struve's Sea"), near Messala

Lacus

A related set of features are the Lunar lacus (singular lacus, Latin for "lake"), which are smaller basaltic plains of similar origin:

Sinus and Paludes

A related set of features are the sinus (singular sinus, Latin for "bay") and paludes (singular palus, Latin for "marsh"):

Some sources also list a Palus Nebularum ("Marsh of Mists") at 38.0° N, 1.0° E, but the designation for this feature has not been officially recognized by the IAU.

Craters 
The large majority of these features are impact craters. The crater nomenclature is governed by the International Astronomical Union, and this list only includes features that are officially recognized by that scientific society.

The lunar craters are listed in the following subsections. Where a formation has associated satellite craters (smaller associated craters), these are detailed on the main crater description pages.

Catenae
A catena is a chain of craters.

Valleys

Several large lunar valleys have been given names. Most of them are named after a nearby crater; see the list of craters on the Moon for more information.

Mountains

The heights of the isolated mountains or massifs listed here are not consistently reported across sources. In the 1960s, the US Army Mapping Service used elevation relative to 1,737,988 meters from the center of the Moon. In the 1970s, the US Defense Mapping Agency used 1,730,000 meters. The Clementine topographic data published in the 1990s uses 1,737,400 meters.

This list is not comprehensive, and does not list the highest places on the Moon. Clementine data show a range of about 18,100 meters from lowest to highest point on the Moon. The highest point, located on the far side of the Moon, is approximately 6500 meters higher than Mons Huygens (usually listed as the tallest mountain).

Mountains are referred to using the Latin word mons (plural montes).

Mountain ranges

Other features

The Moon's surface exhibits many other geological features. In addition to mountains, valleys, and impact craters, the following surface features have received names in the Lunar nomenclature, many of them named after a nearby crater or mountain.

The listed diameter for these features is the longest dimension that contains the entire geological formation. The latitudes and longitudes are in selenographic coordinates.

Albedo
These features have a high albedo compared to the surrounding terrain.

On the far side of the Moon there are unnamed albedo features on Mare Ingenii and Mare Marginis. These are located antipodal to the Mare Imbrium and Mare Orientale impact basins.

Dorsa
A dorsum (plural dorsa, meaning back or ridge) is a wrinkle-ridge system commonly found on lunar maria.

Promontoria
These features form a cape or headland on a mare.

Rimae
Rimae (singular rima) are lunar rilles.

Rupes
These are escarpments in the surface.

Terrae

The continental areas between the seas were given comparable names by Giovanni Battista Riccioli, but were opposite the names used for the seas. Thus there were the lands of sterility (Terra Sterilitatis), heat (Terra Caloris), and liveliness (Terra Vitae). However these names for the highland regions are no longer used on recent maps, and Terrae are not officially recognized as standard lunar nomenclature by the International Astronomical Union.

See also 

 Lunar craters
 Topography of the Moon
 List of mountain ranges
 List of mountains on the Moon by height
 List of named features on the Far Side of the Moon

References 

These were used for references in the Water Features section.
 , no ISBN.
 Ben Bussey and Paul Spudis, The Clementine Atlas of the Moon, Cambridge University Press, 2004, .
 Antonín Rükl, Atlas of the Moon, Kalmbach Books, 1990, .
 Ewen A. Whitaker, Mapping and Naming the Moon, Cambridge University Press, 1999, .

The following sources were used as references on the individual crater pages.

External links 
NASA lunar Atlas
IAU, USGS: Moon nomenclature
IAU, USGS: Moon nomenclature: mountains
 Astronomica Langrenus — Italian Lunar Web Site
 Gazetteer of Planetary Nomenclature
 Lunar Atlases at the Lunar & Planetary Institute
 Digital Lunar Orbiter Photographic Atlas of the Moon
 Lunar Nomenclature
 Lunar Photo of the Day by Charles A. Wood et al.

 
 
Moon

Features